Andrew McKaige (born 1959) is an Australian actor, most prominent in television soap opera. As well as acting, McKaige is also a voice-artist and  singer-songwriter, having played with the country rock band, The Fine Line. In 1994, he won second place for Best Song in the Country Category of the Australian Songwriter's Association.

Divorced, McKaige met his ex-wife Leslie while living in Los Angeles. After seven years of marriage, the couple divorced when McKaige returned to Australia for a role in the Nine Network television soap series Paradise Beach.

Early life
Coming from a family of avid Australian Rules Football fans, In his teens, McKaige, along with his brothers played for Melbourne Football Club, and was named Under 17's Best and Fairest in 1975. His father, Ken McKaige, played for a number of different clubs over his career. At the age of five years, his brother Cameron was the youngest person ever signed to a league club. This was to ensure that he was not later residentially tied to play for Richmond.

Roles 
While best known for his roles in Australian night-time soap operas, McKaige began his television career playing in comedy skits on the Paul Hogan Show. He then went on to play small roles on programs that included Cop Shop and The Sullivans. His big break came when he landed a recurring role in Skyways.

In addition to being an original cast member of the 1980s soap opera Sons and Daughters, he went on to be the second actor to play the role of Marty Jackson in Prisoner – succeeding Ronald Korosy and preceding Michael Winchester.

After residing in Los Angeles for a number of years, he returned to Australia and has since appeared in Paradise Beach, Blue Heelers, Neighbours, All Saints and The Secret Life of Us. He provides the voice of Pvt. Chips Dubbo in the Halo videogame series.

Filmography

References

External links
 

1959 births
Australian male film actors
Australian male soap opera actors
Australian male video game actors
Australian male voice actors
Living people
Male actors from Melbourne
20th-century Australian male actors
21st-century Australian male actors